Dorotej or Dorotheus was a Serbian Orthodox abbot of Hilandar and the protos of Mount Athos from 1356 until 1366. He is noted for writing a charter for the monastery of Drenča in 1382.

Life

Drenča
The village of Drenča, 5 km north of town of Aleksandrovac, was home to the ruined church of Dušmanica, as it is called by village's elders. The monk Dorotej, the third Prior of Hilandar Monastery with his son Danilo (who later became Patriarch Danilo III of the Serbian Patriarchate of Peć, from 1390 to 1397) built the monastery of Drenča in 1382 and dedicated it to the Presentation of the Holy Virgin. The two founders gifted the shrine with numerous estates and established its economic status which was regularly supplied with continuous income. At the south-west angle of the Monastery Church naos the building founders's graves are covered with large stone blocks. With its decoration similar to the Veluće and Rudenica monasteries, the architectural style of Drenča Monastery is of the early school of Morava architecture. Prince Lazar confirmed large properties in the area of town of Kruševac and Braničevo area. The church of Drenča Monastery has a three-foil base combined with an inscribed cross, richly decorated and built of stone and bricks, a slim cupola resting on four free pillars, and an eastern apse with specific sections for the vestry and deacons. The monastery church widens from west side towards the three-part altar space, towards the apse which is a semi-eclipse from inside and five-sided from the outside, and towards the deacon and the vestry, used to be covered with the cross-ceiling. 
 
Drenča Monastery with its Church dedicated to the Presentation of the Holy Virgin was long time in ruins to experience eventually its thorough reconstruction at the beginning of the second Millennium and gather again religious people from the Zupa region, near Aleksandrovac.

See also
Teodosije the Hilandarian (1246-1328), one of the most important Serbian writers in the Middle Ages
Elder Grigorije (fl. 1310-1355), builder of Saint Archangels Monastery
Antonije Bagaš (fl. 1356-1366), bought and restored the Agiou Pavlou monastery
Lazar the Hilandarian (fl. 1404), the first known Serbian and Russian watchmaker
Pachomius the Serb (fl. 1440s-1484), hagiographer of the Russian Church
 Miroslav Gospel
 Gabriel the Hilandarian
 Constantine of Kostenets
 Cyprian, Metropolitan of Kiev and All Rus'
 Gregory Tsamblak
 Isaija the Monk

References

Sources
A. Mladenović, Povelje kneza Lazara (Belgrade, 2003) pp. 177–190 (Drenča)

14th-century Serbian people
People of the Serbian Empire
Medieval Serbian Orthodox clergy
Medieval Athos
Athonite Fathers
People associated with Hilandar Monastery